The LECOM Suncoast Classic is a golf tournament on the Korn Ferry Tour. It was first played from February 14–17, 2019, at the Lakewood National Golf Club in Lakewood Ranch, Florida. The 2023 tournament will take place April 20-23. The title sponsor is Lake Erie College of Osteopathic Medicine (LECOM) which has a campus in nearby Lakewood Ranch.

Winners

Bolded golfers graduated to the PGA Tour via the Korn Ferry Tour regular-season money list.
Source:

References

External links

Coverage on the Korn Ferry Tour's official site

Korn Ferry Tour events
Golf in Florida
Recurring sporting events established in 2019
2019 establishments in Florida